Omignano is a town and comune in the province of Salerno in the Campania region of south-western Italy.

Geography
The municipality borders with Casal Velino, Lustra, Salento, Sessa Cilento and Stella Cilento.

See also
Cilento

References

External links

     

Cities and towns in Campania
Localities of Cilento